Emperor Go-Daigo (後醍醐天皇 Go-Daigo-tennō) (26 November 1288 – 19 September 1339) was the 96th emperor of Japan, according to the traditional order of succession. He successfully overthrew the Kamakura shogunate in 1333 and established the short lived Kenmu Restoration to bring the Imperial House back into power. This was to be the last time the emperor had real power until the Meiji Restoration in 1868. The Kenmu restoration was in turn overthrown by Ashikaga Takauji in 1336, ushering in the Ashikaga shogunate, and split the imperial family into two opposing factions between the Ashikaga backed Northern Court situated in Kyoto and the Southern Court based in Yoshino led by Go-Daigo and his later successors.

This 14th-century sovereign personally chose his posthumous name after the 9th-century Emperor Daigo and go- (後), translates as "later", and he is thus sometimes called the "Later Emperor Daigo", or, in some older sources, "Daigo, the second" or as "Daigo II".

Biography
Before his ascension to the Chrysanthemum Throne, his personal name (imina) was Takaharu-shinnō (尊治親王).

He was the second son of the Daikakuji-tō emperor, Emperor Go-Uda. His mother was Fujiwara no Chūshi/Tadako (藤原忠子), daughter of Fujiwara no Tadatsugu (Itsutsuji Tadatsugu) (藤原忠継/五辻忠継). She became Nyoin called Dantenmon-in (談天門院). His older brother was Emperor Go-Nijō.

Emperor Go-Daigo's ideal was the Engi era (901–923) during the reign of Emperor Daigo, a period of direct imperial rule.  An emperor's posthumous name was normally chosen after his death, but Emperor Go-Daigo chose his personally during his lifetime, to share it with Emperor Daigo.

Events of Go-Daigo's life

 1308 (Enkyō 1): At the death of Emperor Go-Nijō, Hanazono accedes to the Chrysanthemum Throne at age 12 years; and Takaharu-shinnō, the second son of former-Emperor Go-Uda is elevated as Crown Prince and heir apparent under the direction of the Kamakura shogunate.
 29 March 1318 (Bunpō 2, 26th day of 2nd month): In the 11th year of Hanazono's reign (花園天皇十一年), the emperor abdicated; and the succession (senso) was received by his cousin, the second son of former-Emperor Go-Uda.  Shortly thereafter, Emperor Go-Daigo is said to have acceded to the throne (sokui).
 1319 (Bunpō 3, 4th month): Emperor Go-Daigo caused the nengō to be changed to Gen'ō to mark the beginning of his reign.
In 1324, with the discovery of Emperor Go-Daigo's plans to overthrow the Kamakura shogunate, the Rokuhara Tandai disposed of his close associate Hino Suketomo in the Shōchū Incident.

In the Genkō Incident of 1331, Emperor Go-Daigo's plans were again discovered, this time by a betrayal by his close associate Yoshida Sadafusa.  He quickly hid the Sacred Treasures in a secluded castle in Kasagiyama (the modern town of Kasagi, Sōraku District, Kyōto Prefecture) and raised an army, but the castle fell to the shogunate's army the following year, and they enthroned Emperor Kōgon, exiling Daigo to Oki Province (the Oki Islands in modern-day Shimane Prefecture), the same place to which Emperor Go-Toba had been exiled after the Jōkyū War of 1221.

In 1333, Emperor Go-Daigo escaped from Oki with the help of Nawa Nagatoshi and his family, raising an army at Senjo Mountain in Hōki Province (the modern town of Kotoura in Tōhaku District, Tottori Prefecture). Ashikaga Takauji, who had been sent by the shogunate to find and destroy this army, sided with the emperor and captured the Rokuhara Tandai.  Immediately following this, Nitta Yoshisada, who had raised an army in the east, laid siege to Kamakura. When the city finally fell to Nitta, Hōjō Takatoki, the shogunal regent, fled to Tōshō temple, where he and his entire family committed suicide. This ended Hōjō power and paved the way for a new military regime.

Upon his triumphal return to Kyoto, Daigo took the throne from Emperor Kōgon and began the Kenmu Restoration. The Restoration was ostensibly a revival of the older ways, but, in fact, the emperor had his eye set on an imperial dictatorship like that of the emperor of China. He wanted to imitate the Chinese in all their ways and become the most powerful ruler in the East. Impatient reforms, litigation over land rights, rewards, and the exclusion of the samurai from the political order caused much complaining, and his political order began to fall apart. In 1335, Ashikaga Takauji, who had travelled to eastern Japan without obtaining an imperial edict in order to suppress the Nakasendai Rebellion, became disaffected. Daigo ordered Nitta Yoshisada to track down and destroy Ashikaga. Ashikaga defeated Nitta Yoshisada at the Battle of Takenoshita, Hakone. Kusunoki Masashige and Kitabatake Akiie, in communication with Kyoto, smashed the Ashikaga army. Takauji fled to Kyūshū, but the following year, after reassembling his army, he again approached Kyōto. Kusunoki Masashige proposed a reconciliation with Takauji to the emperor, but Go-Daigo rejected this. He ordered Masashige and Yoshisada to destroy Takauji. Kusunoki's army was defeated at the Battle of Minatogawa.

When Ashikaga's army entered Kyōto, Emperor Go-Daigo resisted, fleeing to Mount Hiei, but seeking reconciliation, he sent the imperial regalia to the Ashikaga side. Takauji enthroned the Jimyōin-tō emperor, Kōmyō, and officially began his shogunate with the enactment of the Kenmu Law Code.

Go-Daigo escaped from the capital in January 1337, the regalia that he had handed over to the Ashikaga being counterfeit, and set up the Southern Court among the mountains of Yoshino, beginning the Period of Northern and Southern Courts in which the Northern Dynasty in Kyoto and the Southern Dynasty in Yoshino faced off against each other.

Emperor Go-Daigo ordered Imperial Prince Kaneyoshi to Kyūshū and Nitta Yoshisada and Imperial Prince Tsuneyoshi to Hokuriku, and so forth, dispatching his sons all over, so that they could oppose the Northern Court.

 18 September 1339 (Ryakuō 2, 15th day of the 8th month):  In the 21st year of Go-Daigo's reign, the emperor abdicated at Yoshino in favor of his son, Noriyoshi-shinnō, who would become Emperor Go-Murakami.
 19 September 1339 (Ryakuō 2, 16th day of the 8th month): Go-Daigo died;

The actual site of Go-Daigo's grave is settled.  This emperor is traditionally venerated at a memorial Shinto shrine (misasagi) at Nara.

The Imperial Household Agency designates this location as Go-Daigo's mausoleum.  It is formally named Tō-no-o no misasagi.

Genealogy

Consorts and children

Empress (Chūgū): Saionji Kishi (西園寺禧子) later Empress Dowager Go-Kyōgoku-in (後京極院), Saionji Sanekane's daughter
 Princess (b. 1314)
 Second Daughter: Imperial Princess Kanshi (懽子内親王, 1315–1362) later Empress Dowager Senseimon-in (宣政門院), Saiō at Ise Shrine; later, married to Emperor Kōgon

Empress (Chūgū): Imperial Princess Junshi (珣子内親王) later Empress Dowager Shin-Muromachi-in (新室町院), Emperor Go-Fushimi’s daughter
 Imperial Princess Sachiko (幸子内親王, b. 1335)

Nyōgo: Fujiwara no Eishi (藤原栄子) also Anfuku-dono (安福殿), Nijō Michihira’s daughter

Court lady: Fujiwara no Chikako (藤原親子) also Chūnagon-tenji (中納言典侍), Itsutsuji Munechika's daughter
 Eleventh Son: Imperial Prince Mitsuyoshi (満良親王)

Lady-in-waiting: Dainagon'nosuke, Kitabatake Moroshige's daughter

Lady-in-waiting: Shin-Ansatsu-tenji (新按察典侍), Jimyoin Yasufuji's daughter

Lady-in-waiting: Sochi-no-suke (帥典侍讃岐)

Court lady: Koto no Naishi (勾当内侍), Saionji Tsunafusa's daughter
 Princess

Court lady: Shōshō no Naishi (少将内侍), Sugawara no Arinaka's daughter
Imperial Prince Seijo (聖助法親王) – Head Priest of Onjō-ji

Court lady: Fujiwara (Ano) no Renshi (藤原廉子/阿野廉子) later Empress Dowager Shin-Taikenmon-in (新待賢門院, 1301–1359), Ano Kinkado's daughter
 Imperial Prince Tsunenaga (also Tsuneyoshi) (恒良親王)
 Imperial Prince Nariyoshi (also Narinaga) (成良親王)
 Imperial Prince Noriyoshi (義良親王) later become Emperor Go-Murakami
 Imperial Princess Shoshi (祥子内親王) – Saiō at Ise Shrine 1333–1336; later, nun in Hōan-ji
 Imperial Princess Ishi (惟子内親王) – nun in Imabayashi
 Speculated - Imperial Princess Noriko (憲子内親王) later Empress Dowager Shinsenyō-mon-in (新宣陽門院)

Court lady: Minamoto no Chikako (源親子), Kitabatake Morochika's daughter
 Imperial Prince Moriyoshi (or Morinaga) (護良親王) – Head Priest of Enryakuji (Tendai-zasu, 天台座主) (Buddhist name: Prince Son'un, 尊雲法親王)
 Imperial Prince Kōshō (恒性, 1305–1333) – priest
 Imperial Princess Hishi (妣子内親王) – nun in Imabayashi
 princess – married to Konoe Mototsugu (divorced later)
 Imperial Prince Sonsho (尊性法親王)

Court lady: Fujiwara no Ishi/Tameko (藤原為子, d. ), Nijō Tameyo's daughter
 Imperial Prince Takanaga (also Takayoshi) (尊良親王)
 Imperial Prince Munenaga (also Muneyoshi) (宗良親王) – Head Priest of Enryakuji (Tendai-zasu, 天台座主) (Buddhist name: Prince Sonchō, 尊澄法親王)
 Imperial Princess Tamako (瓊子内親王, 1316–1339) – nun
 Princess

Nyōgo: Fujiwara no Jisshi (実子). Tōin Saneo's daughter
 Princess

Court lady: Fujiwara no Shushi/Moriko (藤原守子, 1303–1357), daughter of Tōin Saneyasu (洞院実泰)
 Imperial Prince Gen'en (玄円法親王, d.1348) – Head Priest of Kōfuku-ji
 Imperial Prince Saikei (最恵法親王) – priest in Myōhō-in

Princess: Imperial Princess Kenshi (憙子内親王, 1270–1324) later Empress Dowager Shōkeimon'in (昭慶門院), Emperor Kameyama’s daughter
 Mumon Gensen (無文元選, 1323–1390) – founder of Hōkō-ji (Shizuoka)

Court lady: Fujiwara (Nijo) Michiko (二条道子) also Gon-no-Dainagon no Sammi no Tsubone (権大納言三位局, d. 1351) later Reisho-in (霊照院), Nijō Tamemichi's daughter
 Imperial Prince Hōnin (法仁法親王, 1325–1352) – priest in Ninna-ji
 Prince Kaneyoshi (also Kanenaga) (懐良親王, 1326–1383) – Seisei Taishōgun (征西大将軍) 1336–?
 princess

Court lady: Ichijō no Tsubone (一条局) later Yūgimon'in (遊義門院), Saionji Sanetoshi's daughter
 Imperial Prince Tokiyoshi (also Yoyoshi) (世良親王) ( – 1330)
 Imperial Prince Jōson (静尊法親王) (Imperial Prince Keison, 恵尊法親王) – priest in Shōgoin (聖護院)
 Imperial Princess Kinshi (欣子内親王) – nun in Imabayashi

Court lady: Shōnagon no Naishi (少納言内侍), Shijō Takasuke's daughter
 Sonshin (尊真) – priest

Nyōgo: Dainagon-no-tsubone (大納言局), Ogimachi Saneakira's daughter
 Imperial Princess Naoko (瑜子内親王)

Nyōgo: Saemon-no-kami-no-tsubone (左衛門督局), Nijō Tametada's daughter
 Nun in Imabayashi

Court lady: Gon-no-Chūnagon no Tsubone (権中納言局), Sanjō Kinyasu's daughter
 Imperial Princess Sadako (貞子内親王)

Nyōgo: Yoshida Sadafusa's daughter

Nyōgo: Bōmon-no-tsubone (坊門局), Bomon Kiyotada's daughter
 Princess (Yōdō?)

Nyōgo: Horikawa Mototomo's daughter
 Princess

Nyōgo: Minamoto-no-Yasuko (源康子) also Asukai-no-tsubone (飛鳥井局) later Enseimon'in Harima (延政門院播磨), Minamoto-no-Yasutoki's daughter

Nyōgo: Wakamizu-no-tsubone (若水局), Minamoto-no-Yasutoki's daughter

Nyōgo: Horiguchi Sadayoshi's daughter
 daughter married Yoshimizu Munemasa

Court lady: Konoe no Tsubone (近衛局) later Shōkunmon'in (昭訓門院)
 Prince Tomoyoshi (知良王)

(unknown women)
 Yōdō (d. 1398) – 5th Head Nun of Tōkei-ji
 Rokujō Arifusa's wife
 Ryusen Ryosai (竜泉令淬, d.1366)
 Kenkō (賢光)
Go-Daigo had some other princesses from some court ladies.

Kugyō
Kugyō (公卿) is a collective term for the very few most powerful men attached to the court of the Emperor of Japan in pre-Meiji eras. Even during those years in which the court's actual influence outside the palace walls was minimal, the hierarchic organization persisted.

In general, this elite group included only three to four men at a time.  These were hereditary courtiers whose experience and background would have brought them to the pinnacle of a life's career.  During Go-Daigo's reign, this apex of the Daijō-kan included:
 Kampaku, Nijō Michihira, 1316–1318
 Kampaku, Ichijō Uchitsune, 1318–1323
 Kampaku, Kujō Fusazane, 1323–1324
 Kampaku, Takatsukasa Fuyuhira, 1324–1327
 Kampaku, Nijō Michihira, 1327–1330
 Kampaku, Konoe Tsunetada, 1330
 Kampaku, Takatsukasa Fuyunori, 1330–1333
 Sadaijin
 Udaijin
 Naidaijin
 Dainagon

Eras of Go-Daigo's reign
The years of Go-Daigo's reign are more specifically identified by more than one era name or nengō.  Emperor Go-Daigo's eight era name changes are mirrored in number only in the reign of Emperor Go-Hanazono, who also reigned through eight era name changes.

Pre-Nanboku-chō court
 Bunpō                (1317–1319)
 Gen'ō          (1319–1321)
 Genkō        (1321–1324)
 Shōchū  (1324–1326)
 Karyaku              (1326–1329)
 Gentoku              (1329–1331)
 Genkō          (1331–1334)
 Kenmu                (1334–1336)

Nanboku-chō southern court
 Eras as reckoned by legitimate sovereign's Court (as determined by Meiji rescript)
 Engen                (1336–1340)

Nanboku-chō northern Court
 Eras as reckoned by pretender sovereign's Court (as determined by Meiji rescript)
 Shōkei        (1332–1338)
 Ryakuō        (1338–1342)

In popular culture
Emperor Go-Daigo appears in the alternate history novel Romanitas by Sophia McDougall.

See also

 Emperor of Japan
 List of Emperors of Japan
 Imperial cult
 Yoshimizu Shrine
 Yoshino Shrine

Notes

References
 Ponsonby-Fane, Richard Arthur Brabazon. (1959).  The Imperial House of Japan. Kyoto: Ponsonby Memorial Society. OCLC 194887
 Titsingh, Isaac. (1834). Nihon Ōdai Ichiran; ou,  Annales des empereurs du Japon.  Paris: Royal Asiatic Society, Oriental Translation Fund of Great Britain and Ireland. OCLC 5850691
 Varley, H. Paul. (1980). Jinnō Shōtōki: A Chronicle of Gods and Sovereigns. New York: Columbia University Press. ; OCLC 59145842

External links
 Kansai Digital Archives: Go-Daigo mausoleum enclosure, image

 
 

 
Japanese emperors
1288 births
1339 deaths
Emperor Go-Daigo
Emperor Go-Daigo
Emperor Go-Daigo
Emperor Go-Daigo
13th-century Japanese people
14th-century Japanese monarchs
Deified Japanese people